Martin Karplus (born March 15, 1930) is an Austrian and American theoretical chemist. He is the Director of the Biophysical Chemistry Laboratory, a joint laboratory between the French National Center for Scientific Research and the University of Strasbourg, France. He is also the Theodore William Richards Professor of Chemistry, emeritus at Harvard University. Karplus received the 2013 Nobel Prize in Chemistry, together with Michael Levitt and Arieh Warshel, for "the development of multiscale models for complex chemical systems".

Early life 
Martin Karplus was born in Vienna, Austria. He was a child when his family fled from the Nazi-occupation in Austria a few days after the Anschluss in March 1938, spending several months in Zürich, Switzerland and La Baule, France before immigrating to the United States.  Prior to their immigration to the United States, the family was known for being "an intellectual and successful secular Jewish family" in Vienna. His grandfather, Johann Paul Karplus (1866-1936) was a highly acclaimed professor of psychiatry at the University of Vienna. His great-aunt, Eugenie Goldstern, was an ethnologist who was killed during the Holocaust. He is the nephew, by marriage, of the sociologist, philosopher and musicologist Theodor W. Adorno and grandnephew of the physicist Robert von Lieben. His brother, Robert Karplus, was an internationally recognized physicist and educator at University of California, Berkeley. Continuing with the academic family theme, his nephew, Andrew Karplus, is a highly respected biochemistry and biophysics professor at Oregon State University.

Education 
After earning an AB degree from Harvard College in 1951, Karplus pursued graduate studies at the California Institute of Technology. He completed his PhD in 1953 under Nobel laureate Linus Pauling. According to Pauling, Karplus "was [his] most brilliant student." He was an NSF Postdoctoral Fellow at the University of Oxford (1953–55) where he worked with Charles Coulson.

Teaching career 
Karplus taught at the University of Illinois at Urbana–Champaign (1955–60) and then Columbia University (1960–65) before moving to chemistry faculty at Harvard in 1966. 

He was a professor at the  Louis Pasteur University in 1996 where he established a research group in Strasbourg, France, after two sabbatical visits between 1992 and 1995 in the NMR laboratory of Jean-François Lefèvre. He has supervised more than 200 graduate students and postdoctoral researchers over his career since 1955.

Research
He published his first academic paper when he was 17 years old.  Karplus has contributed to many fields in physical chemistry, including chemical dynamics, quantum chemistry, and most notably, molecular dynamics simulations of biological macromolecules. He has also been influential in nuclear magnetic resonance spectroscopy, particularly to the understanding of nuclear spin-spin coupling and electron spin resonance spectroscopy. The Karplus equation describing the correlation between coupling constants and dihedral angles in proton nuclear magnetic resonance spectroscopy is named after him.

In 1970 postdoctoral fellow Arieh Warshel joined Karplus at Harvard. Together they wrote a computer program that modeled the atomic nuclei and some electrons of a molecule using classical physics and modeling other electrons using quantum mechanics. In 1974 Karplus, Washel and other collaborators published a paper based on this type of modeling which successfully modeled the change in shape of retinal, a large complex protein molecule important to vision.

His current research is concerned primarily with the properties of molecules of biological interest. His group originated and coordinated the development of the CHARMM program for molecular dynamics simulations.

Books
 Martin Karplus. Spinach on the Ceiling: The Multifaceted Life of a Theoretical Chemist, World Scientific Publishing, UK 2020.
 CL Brooks III, M Karplus, BM Pettitt. Proteins: A Theoretical Perspective of Dynamics, Structure and Thermodynamics, Volume LXXI, in: Advances in Chemical Physics, John Wiley & Sons, New York 1988.
 Martin Karplus and Richard N. Porter. Atoms and Molecules: An Introduction for Students of Physical Chemistry. W. A. Benjamin, New York 1970.

Notable students and postdocs
Charles L. Brooks III (University of Michigan, Ann Arbor) 
Axel T. Brünger (Stanford University)
J. Andrew McCammon (UCSD) (w/ Karplus and Gelin) published the first MD simulation of BPTI (see above publication)
P. T. Narasimhan (University of Illinois) Shanti Swarup Bhatnagar laureate
B. Montgomery Pettitt (University of Texas Medical Branch, Baylor College of Medicine, The Gulf Coast Consortia (GCC)])
Benoît Roux (University of Chicago)
Andrej Šali (University of California, San Francisco)
Klaus Schulten (University of Illinois)
Jeremy C. Smith (Oak Ridge National Laboratory)
David J. States (The University of Texas Health Science Center at Houston)
Arieh Warshel  (University of Southern California) (co-recipient of the 2013 Nobel Prize in Chemistry, along with Karplus and Michael Levitt (Stanford))

Awards and honours
Karplus was elected a member of the National Academy of Sciences in 1967. He was awarded the  Irving Langmuir Award in 1987. He is a member of the International Academy of Quantum Molecular Science. He became foreign member of the Royal Netherlands Academy of Arts and Sciences in 1991 and was elected a Foreign Member of the Royal Society (ForMemRS) in 2000. He is a recipient of the Christian B. Anfinsen Award, given in 2001. He was awarded the Linus Pauling Award in 2004 and the Nobel Prize in Chemistry in 2013.

Personal life 
Karplus is married to Marci and has three children.

References

External links

  including the Nobel Lecture on 8 December 2013 Development of Multiscale Models for Complex Chemical Systems From H+H2 to Biomolecules
 Publications
 Karplus research group at Harvard University
 Biophysical Chemistry Laboratory at University of Strasbourg 
 Biography at Michigan State University website
 Martin Karplus photography website
Martin Karplus's autobiography Spinach on the Ceiling: The Multifaceted Life of a Theoretical Chemist
Meet the Author: Martin Karplus, book launch of Spinach on the Ceiling: The Multifaceted Life of a Theoretical Chemist

1930 births
Living people
Nobel laureates in Chemistry
American Nobel laureates
Austrian Nobel laureates
Jewish Nobel laureates
21st-century American chemists
Jewish biophysicists
American biophysicists
Jewish emigrants from Austria to the United Kingdom after the Anschluss
California Institute of Technology alumni
Foreign Members of the Royal Society
Members of the International Academy of Quantum Molecular Science
Harvard College alumni
Harvard University faculty
Jewish American scientists
Jewish chemists
Members of the Royal Netherlands Academy of Arts and Sciences
Members of the United States National Academy of Sciences
Theoretical chemists
Academic staff of the University of Strasbourg
Columbia University faculty
University of Illinois faculty
Computational chemists